A declaration of war is a formal declaration issued by a national government indicating that a state of war exists between that nation and another.

In the United Kingdom, the government and command of the armed forces is vested in the sovereign. Under the sovereign, direct control of the armed forces is divided between the government and the Defence Council. However, a constitutional convention has developed regarding parliamentary approval for military action.

There has been a long-running debate regarding whether Parliament alone should have the power to declare war and more widely to commit British forces to armed conflict. This was attempted (to the limited extent of possible war against Iraq) in 1999 with the introduction of the Military Action Against Iraq (Parliamentary Approval) Bill. However Queen Elizabeth II, acting upon the advice of her government at the time, refused to grant her consent to allow the bill to be debated in Parliament and so it was dropped (Queen's Consent was needed before debate could take place because the bill affected the royal prerogative). The Constitutional Reform and Governance Act 2010 originally included a section that would have required Parliamentary approval for use of the armed forces, but this was dropped from the bill before royal assent.

There have been no declarations of war since the Second World War (against Thailand in 1942, to be precise), though British Armed Forces have taken part in armed conflict on numerous occasions nonetheless. It is considered, in light of developments in international law since 1945, notably the Charter of the United Nations, that a declaration of war is now redundant as a formal international legal instrument.

The procedure for a declaration of war is set out in a letter dated the 23rd August 1939 from Gerald Fitzmaurice. It reads:Mr Harvey [Halifax's Private Secretary to whom Fitzmaurice's reply was sent].

The Secretary of State's enquiry about how we declare war. The method of procedure is to deliver a declaration of war to the diplomatic representative in London of the enemy Power or Powers at such hour as may be decided upon by the Cabinet and to obtain a receipt recording the time of delivery. The declaration is delivered by a special messenger who should take with him the special passports covering the enemy representative, his family and personal staff and his diplomatic staff and their families. These are now being drafted on the assumption that war would in the first place be only declared on Germany and the Secretary of State would have to sign them.

It is not possible to state definitely at present what the terms of the declaration of war itself would be as these must depend upon circumstances. It is quite likely that our declaration of war might be preceded by an ultimatum which would be delivered in Berlin. This might e.g. take the form that if by a certain time the German Government had not given an assurance that they would proceed no further with their violation of Polish territory the Ambassador had instructed to ask for his passports and that His Majesty's Government would have to take such steps as might seem good to them. In such a case our actual declaration of war on the expiry of the time limit would take the form of notifying the German Embassy that no satisfactory reply having received from the German Government, His Majesty's Government considered that a state of war between the two countries existed as from a certain time.

I understand that the declaration would be drafted in consultation with the Dominions Office.

Once the declaration has been delivered a lot of consequential results follow, such as informing the other Government Departments that war has been declared and giving the same information to the diplomatic representatives in London of non-enemy powers and so forth. Standing drafts for all these purposes exist.

Formal declarations of war by the Kingdom of Great Britain

The following table refers to declarations of war from the Act of Union in 1707 until the creation of the United Kingdom of Great Britain and Ireland in 1801.

Formal declarations of war by the United Kingdom

The following table refers to declarations of war since the creation of the United Kingdom in 1801. In 1927 the United Kingdom of Great Britain and Ireland was renamed the "United Kingdom of Great Britain and Northern Ireland".

See also
Declaration of war
Undeclared war
List of wars involving Great Britain
Declaration of war by Canada
Declaration of war by the United States
Constitution of the United Kingdom

Notes and references

External links
War Powers and Treaties: Limiting Executive Powers (pub. October 2007 (accessed on 2016.10.09)

Wars involving the United Kingdom
Wars involving Great Britain
United Kingdom
Constitution of the United Kingdom
Foreign relations of the United Kingdom